, known professionally as Ruan (stylized as RUAN) is a Japanese singer. She is a member of the upcoming girl group Moonchild.

Biography 

Ruann was born in Osaka Prefecture in 2003. Interested in music from a young age, Ruann taught herself instruments such as acoustic guitar, piano as well as Korean and English through learning apps. Her early exposures to the world of entertainment included an appearance on Kanjani no Shiwake 8, where she covered Lady Gaga's "Telephone" in 2013, and when she was chosen to sing the theme song for the kabuki adaptation of the manga One Piece, Super Kabuki II: One Piece, "Tetote", a composition written by Yujin Kitagawa of the Japanese band Yuzu. Ruann uploaded videos on social media of covers and busking performances. One of these performances was seen by Taka, the vocalist of the band One Ok Rock, who asked Ruann to perform their song "Wherever You Are" as a special guest during their 2017 Ambitions tour. In summer 2017, she released her first extended play Spice 13 Acoustic EP.

Her first release as Ruann was "Get the Glory", a digital single released in January 2018 used to promote Cygames, followed by "I Am Standing", a song used as the ending theme song for the anime March Comes in Like a Lion. In August, Ruann announced her major label debut through Toy's Factory. Her single "There's No Ending", used as the theme song for the film Anemone: Psalm of Planets Eureka Seven: Hi-Evolution (2018), was her most successful release to date, and her first release to chart on a Billboard Japan subchart.

In March 2019, Ruann's official website announced that she was taking a hiatus due to poor health. In June, Ruann tweeted that her contract with Toy's Factory had ended, and in July announced that she would make her debut in Korea with the song "Beep Beep", which was released simultaneously in Japan and Korea. Korean production team Black Eyed Pilseung produced the song, while the music video featured a routine produced by choreographer Lia Kim.

Following issues with the copyright ownership of her stage name, Ruann stopped posting in July 2020. In October, all of her social media accounts were cleared of content. Her social media accounts and her official website were deleted on October 31, 2020.

After over a year of absence from the entertainment industry, Ruann reappeared in January 2022 as one of the trainees on LDH and HYBE Labels’s reality program iCON-Z under her birth name, Ohyama Ruan. She finished in third place, thus becoming a member of Moonchild.

Artistry 

Ruann's influences include Michael Jackson, Lady Gaga and Taylor Swift. She composes music on the guitar.

Discography

Extended plays

Singles

Promotional singles

References

External links 

Former official Sony Music Japan label profile
Former official Toy's Factory label profile

2003 births
21st-century Japanese singers
21st-century Japanese women singers
English-language singers from Japan
Korean-language singers of Japan
Living people
Japanese women singer-songwriters
Japanese singer-songwriters
Japanese women pop singers
Musicians from Osaka Prefecture
Hybe Corporation artists
LDH (company) artists